Jonathan Alberto Píriz (born October 2, 1986 in Montevideo, Uruguay) is an Uruguayan footballer who plays as defender. He is currently free agent.

References

External links
 Profile at BDFA
 

1986 births
Living people
Uruguayan footballers
Uruguayan expatriate footballers
Ecuadorian Serie A players
Uruguayan Primera División players
Uruguayan Segunda División players
Peñarol players
C.A. Progreso players
Rampla Juniors players
Centro Atlético Fénix players
Club Nacional de Football players
C.S.D. Independiente del Valle footballers
C.A. Cerro players
Liverpool F.C. (Montevideo) players
Sud América players
Villa Española players
Central Español players
Expatriate footballers in Ecuador
Uruguayan expatriate sportspeople in Ecuador

Association football defenders